Songs in A Minor is the debut studio album by American singer and songwriter Alicia Keys, released on June 5, 2001, by J Records.

Keys began writing songs for the album in 1995 at age 14 and recording the album in 1998 for Columbia Records, but after they rejected it, she signed a recording contract with Clive Davis's Arista Records and eventually J Records. An accomplished, classically trained pianist, Keys wrote, arranged and produced the majority of the album herself. It is a neo soul album with elements of R&B, soul, jazz, hip hop, blues, classical, and gospel music. Lyrically, the songs explore the complexities and various stages of personal relationships. Despite the album's title, only two songs, "Jane Doe" and "Mr. Man," are actually in the key of A minor.
	
Songs in A Minor debuted at number one on the US Billboard 200, selling 236,000 copies in its first week. The album has since sold over 7 million copies in the United States and 12 million copies worldwide. It was also an immediate critical success and has since been regarded as a classic. The album earned Keys several accolades, including five Grammy Awards at the 44th Annual Grammy Awards. To promote the album, Keys embarked on her first headlining concert tour, entitled Songs in A Minor Tour. 

In 2022, the album was selected by the Library of Congress for preservation in the National Recording Registry.

Recording and production
Keys began writing the songs that would constitute Songs in A Minor at age 14, "Butterflyz" being her first composition for the album. Keys had been accepted to Columbia University, which she attended after graduating from the Professional Performing Arts School at age 16. She dropped out after four weeks to pursue her music career full time. She signed a demo deal with Jermaine Dupri and his So So Def label. Keys co-wrote and recorded a song titled "Dah Dee Dah (Sexy Thing)", which appeared on the soundtrack to the 1997 film Men in Black. She also contributed to the So So Def Christmas recordings. Keys began producing and recording the album in 1998. She completed it that same year, but it was rejected by Columbia Records. Keys explained that the producers she was required to work with by the label would tell her to "just get in the booth and sing", which frustrated her. Her record contract with Columbia ended after a dispute with the label. Keys then performed for Clive Davis, who sensed a "special, unique" artist; he bought Keys' contract from Columbia and signed her to Arista Records, which later disbanded.

Following Davis to his newly formed J Records label, Keys rented an apartment and struggled to create an album. She began writing the song "Troubles" and came to a realization: "That's when the album started comin' together. Finally, I knew how to structure my feelings into something that made sense, something that can translate to people. That was a changing point. My confidence was up, way up." Keys learned how to produce by asking questions to the producers and engineers; she wrote, arranged and produced a majority of the album. She recorded the songs "Rock wit U" and "Rear View Mirror", which were featured on the soundtracks to the films Shaft (2000) and Dr. Dolittle 2 (2001), respectively. One of the final songs Keys recorded was "Fallin". A total of 32 songs were recorded for the album. Originally titled Soul Stories in A Minor, the title of the album was changed over concerns that it would limit exposure only to black radio stations.

Music and lyrics

Songs in A Minor is a neo soul album with classical piano references and arpeggios. Keys incorporates classical piano with R&B, soul and jazz into the album's music. With influences of classical piano, classic soul and East Coast hip hop, Keys described the album as a "fusion of my classical training, meshed with what I grew up listening to [...] things I've been exposed to and drawn from and my life experiences". Jane Stevenson of Jam! described the music as "old-school urban sounds and attitude set against a backdrop of classical piano and sweet, warm vocals". USA Todays Steve Jones wrote that Keys "taps into the blues, soul, jazz and even classical music to propel haunting melodies and hard-driving funk". John Mulvey of Yahoo! Music called the album "a gorgeous and ambitious melding of classic soul structures and values to hyper-modern production technique".

The album's opening track, "Piano & I", begins with a rendition of Ludwig van Beethoven's Moonlight Sonata, combined with a hip hop beat. The introduction is followed by "Girlfriend", which was produced by Jermaine Dupri. Commended for its "crisp production", the song samples Ol' Dirty Bastard's "Brooklyn Zoo". Keys' cover of Prince's 1982 ballad "How Come U Don't Call Me Anymore?" (retitled "How Come You Don't Call Me") was inspired by a long-term relationship with a partner. The music critic for PopMatters felt that the song was credible, but fell short from the original and Stephanie Mills's 1980s cover. "Fallin", the gospel-driven lead single and often considered Keys' signature song, contains a sample of James Brown's "It's a Man's Man's Man's World". The song earned Keys comparisons to Aretha Franklin.

"A Woman's Worth", the second single released from the album, is a "gospel-tinged" song that recommends that men show respect to their female partners. "Jane Doe" is a funk-driven song, with backing vocals provided by Kandi Burruss. "The Life", which elicits Curtis Mayfield's "Gimmie Your Love", describes Keys' "philosophy of life and struggle". The song was compared to the work of the English band Sade. "Mr. Man" contains elements of Latin American music and was described as a "sexy and soulful duet", in which Jimmy Cozier "adds his spice". The album ends with the hidden track "Lovin' U", which Christian Ward of NME compared to works of the musical group the Supremes.

Release and promotion

In advance of Songs in A Minor, "Girlfriend" was serviced to urban contemporary radio as a promotional single in early 2001 to "introduce" Keys to the general public. In order to promote her, music executive Clive Davis booked Keys to The Tonight Show with Jay Leno. Davis also wrote a letter to Oprah Winfrey, asking her to allow Keys, along with Jill Scott and India Arie, to perform on her show. The singers performed on The Oprah Winfrey Show, where Keys "wowed" the audience. This led to the album's pre-orders to double that night. From August to October 2001, Keys toured alongside recording artist Maxwell in promotion of the album. Soon after, she embarked on her Songs in A Minor Tour. A concert at KeyArena in Seattle was partly recorded and the live performances were included on the bonus disc of a European reissue of the album, titled Songs in A Minor: Remixed & Unplugged, which was released on October 28, 2002; the bonus disc also includes remixes to the songs from Songs in A Minor. The bonus disc was made available on its own exclusively in Japan, under the title Remixed & Unplugged in A Minor, on February 26, 2003.

On June 28, 2011, Songs in A Minor was re-released in two editions to commemorate its tenth anniversary of release. Both editions feature previously unreleased material and a documentary chronicling the making of Songs in A Minor. At the BET Awards 2011 on June 26, Keys performed a medley of songs, including "Typewriter", "A Woman's Worth" with Bruno Mars and "Maybach Music" with Rick Ross and "Fallin. On June 28, Keys performed "Fallin, "Butterflyz" and "Empire State of Mind (Part II) Broken Down" on Good Morning America. BET aired The Story So Far... Alicia Keys special, highlighting Keys' ten-year career through her BET moments, on June 28. On June 30, Keys performed Songs in A Minor in its entirety and told stories of its recording in a show titled Piano & I: A One Night Only Event With Alicia Keys at the Beacon Theatre in New York City. In an interview for MTV, Keys called its tenth anniversary "incredibly surreal for me" and said of the album in retrospect: "This album is possibly the most precious to me as your first album only happens once, and so Songs in A Minor will always hold a special place in my life that's filled with amazing memories. I'm so proud the songs are still being enjoyed, and I'm crazy excited to share songs never heard before." To celebrate the 20th anniversary of the release of Songs in A Minor, the album was yet again re-released on June 4, 2021 with four bonus tracks, including the previously unreleased "Foolish Heart" and "Crazy (Mi Corazon)".

Singles
Davis sent the music video of the album's lead single "Fallin'" to MTV; "half the women had tears down their face" when the video finished playing. The song was serviced to rhythmic contemporary, urban adult contemporary and urban contemporary radio stations in April 2001. "Fallin'" peaked at number one on the Billboard Hot 100 and Hot R&B/Hip-Hop Songs charts, remaining atop the charts for six and four weeks, respectively. It became the most played song in the United States at the time and was certified gold by the Recording Industry Association of America (RIAA). Internationally, "Fallin'" peaked within the top ten in almost all countries it charted in, topping the charts in Flanders, the Netherlands and New Zealand, as well as the UK R&B Singles chart.

"A Woman's Worth" was released as the album's second single on October 2, 2001. It peaked at number seven on the Billboard Hot 100. The single was certified gold by the RIAA. Internationally, the song reached number one in Croatia and top ten in Hungary and New Zealand. The single's accompanying music video was directed by Chris Robinson, who directed the video for "Fallin'". Its plot continues from the video for "Fallin'", which revolves around Keys' travel to her imprisoned boyfriend, and picks up where it left, depicting his release from prison and tries to acclimate to society.

The third single "How Come You Don't Call Me" was released on March 11, 2002. It peaked at number 59 on the Billboard Hot 100, failing to duplicate the commercial success of its predecessors. Elsewhere, the song peaked within the top ten in Hungary and within the top 40 in Australia, Ireland, Scotland and the United Kingdom.

"Girlfriend" peaked at number 82 on the Hot R&B/Hip-Hop Songs chart upon its 2001 release as a promotional single. It was released as the album's fourth and final single outside the United States on November 25, 2002. The song reached top 20 in Australia and the Netherlands, while peaking at number 24 in the UK.

Critical reception

Songs in A Minor received positive reviews from critics. At Metacritic, which assigns a normalized rating out of 100 to reviews from mainstream critics, it received an average score of 78, based on 10 reviews.

Reviewing the album in NME, Sam Faulkner described the balance between contemporary music and retrospective as "an act of pure genius". Q magazine hailed it as "a prime candidate to head up the nu-soul revolution ... with a voice that challenges Mary J. Blige's". Steve Jones of USA Today said that "Keys already has a musical, artistic and thematic maturity that many more experienced artists never achieve". The Washington Posts Richard Harrington wrote favorably of Keys' musical influences on the album and expressed that she has "vocal maturity and writing instincts beyond her years". PopMatters critic Mark Anthony Neal praised Keys' performance on the album and called it "a distinct and oft-times brilliant debut from an artist who clearly has a fine sense of her creative talents". Robert Christgau, writing in The Village Voice, said that the "grace and grit" of the first half warrant the "auspicious debut" label and that, after some "bores that threaten to sink the project midway through," Keys sustains the album with the songs at the end.

Keys' vocal performance was lauded; Sal Cinquemani from Slant Magazine declared that Keys' displayed a "powerful range, proving she can belt along with the best of them". Uncut called the album "frequently stunning" and said that Keys sings like "a young Aretha Franklin". However, some found her lyrics to be sub-par to her singing and musical ability. The New Zealand Heralds Russell Baillie stated that Keys "might indicate abundant talent aligned to neatly reverential vintage soul style", but expressed that the songs "don't add up to anything particularly memorable". Entertainment Weeklys Beth Johnson called the second half of the album slacked with "sad sack teen themes", but called it a promising album. Rolling Stones Barry Walters perceived her singing as more mature than her songwriting, but commended Keys for her "commanding presence" on the album. Los Angeles Times writer Robert Hilburn said that it "makes a convincing case that's she's going far—in both a commercial and creative sense".

In a retrospective review, AllMusic's Stephen Thomas Erlewine perceived the album's music as "rich enough to compensate for some thinness in the writing" and called it "a startling assured, successful debut that deserved its immediate acclaim and is already aging nicely". Barry Walters wrote in a later article for Rolling Stone, "the album has aged well – excepting a drum-machine beat or two, it feels timeless." In the Encyclopedia of Popular Music (2011), Colin Larkin said Keys had fused urban R&B, hip hop, and blues on what he called "a minor classic of modern soul". Songs in A Minor is regarded as an influential and distinctive album of its era.

Accolades
Songs in A Minor led Keys to win five awards at the 44th Annual Grammy Awards: Song of the Year, Best Female R&B Vocal Performance, and Best R&B Song for "Fallin, Best New Artist, and Best R&B Album; "Fallin was also nominated for Record of the Year. Keys became the second female solo artist to win five Grammy Awards in a single night, following Lauryn Hill at the 41st Annual Grammy Awards (1999). The album also won a NAACP Image Award for Outstanding Album. Keys was also named Best New Artist at the 2002 World Music Awards. "Fallin was ranked at number 37 on VH1's 100 Greatest Songs of the Past 25 Years in 2003 and was ranked the 413th greatest song of all time by Blender magazine. The album was ranked at number two on the Rolling Stone magazine's Top 10 of 2001, number 18 on The Village Voices 2001 Pazz & Jop list, number 27 on Mojo magazine's Best 40 Albums of 2001 and was also named one of Q magazine's 100 Greatest Albums Ever. Q also listed the album as one of the best 50 albums of 2001. In 2009, Rolling Stone named it the 95th best album of the past decade, while "Fallin ranked at number 62 on the magazine's "100 Best Songs of the Decade" list. In 2012, Entertainment Weekly ranked Songs in A Minor the 57th best album of all time.

Commercial performance
Songs in A Minor debuted at number one on the US Billboard 200, selling 236,000 copies in its first week. Through word of mouth and promotion, the album remained at number one on the chart, selling 450,000 copies in its second week. The album spent a total of three non-consecutive weeks at number one, and became one of the best-selling albums of 2001. As of June 2014, the album had sold 6,348,000 copies in the United States. Billboard ranked the album at number 32 on the Billboard 200 decade-end chart for the 2000s and at number 12 on the Top R&B/Hip-Hop Albums decade-end chart. In 2001 the album was the 7th best-selling album globally, selling 6.7 million copies. By March 2008, Songs in A Minor had sold over 12 million copies worldwide. On August 19, 2020, the album was certified septuple platinum by the Recording Industry Association of America (RIAA) for combined sales and album-equivalent units of seven million units in the United States.

Track listing

Notes
  signifies an additional producer
  signifies a main producer and remixer
  signifies a remix producer
  signifies a co-producer
  signifies an additional producer and remixer

Sample credits
 "Girlfriend" contains an interpolation of "Brooklyn Zoo" by Ol' Dirty Bastard.

Personnel
Credits adapted from the liner notes of Songs in A Minor.

Musicians

 Alicia Keys – vocals ; piano ; vocal arrangement ; keyboards ; background vocals ; all instruments ; arrangement ; all instruments except violin ; all instruments except bass ; digital programming ; piano concept ; string arrangements 
 Kerry "Krucial" Brothers – drum programming ; digital programming 
 Brian Cox – keyboards 
 Miri – violin ; keyboards ; additional strings 
 Cindy Mizelle – background vocals 
 Tammy Saunders – background vocals 
 Andricka Hall – background vocals 
 Tim Shider – bass ; bass concept 
 Paul L. Green – background vocals 
 Isaac Hayes – string arrangements, flute arrangements, Rhodes piano 
 The Isaac Hayes Orchestra – string arrangements, flute arrangements 
 Norman Hedman – percussion 
 Gerald G. Flowers – guitar 
 Vic Flowers – bass 
 Arty White – guitar 
 Kandi – background vocals 
 Brian McKnight – all instruments 
 Anthony Nance – drum programming 
 Rufus Jackson – bass 
 Jimmy Cozier – vocals 
 Arden Altino – additional keyboards 
 Cato – guitar concept 
 Richie Goods – upright bass ; bass 
 Reggie Flowers – additional fills 
 John Peters – organ 
 A & C Productions – strings

Technical

 Alicia Keys – production ; executive production 
 Kerry "Krucial" Brothers – production ; recording ; additional production concepts 
 Gerry Brown – recording ; mixing 
 Jermaine Dupri – production 
 Brian Frye – recording 
 Phil Tan – mixing 
 Russ Elevado – mixing 
 Manny Marroquin – mixing 
 Kandi – production 
 Ralph Cacciurri – recording 
 Brian McKnight – production 
 Chris Wood – recording 
 Mary Ann Souza – recording assistance 
 Jimmy Cozier – production 
 Arden Altino – production 
 Miri Ben-Ari – production 
 Rick St. Hillaire – recording 
 Tony Maserati – mixing 
 Acar Key – recording 
 Clive Davis – executive production
 Peter Edge – executive production
 Jeff Robinson – executive production
 Herb Powers Jr. – mastering

Artwork
 Tony Duran – photography
 Alli – creative direction, art direction
 Nowhere – design, logo design

Charts

Weekly charts

Year-end charts

Decade-end charts

All-time charts

Certifications

Release history

See also
 Album era
 List of best-selling albums by women
 List of Billboard 200 number-one albums of 2001
 List of Billboard number-one R&B albums of 2001
 List of UK R&B Albums Chart number ones of 2001
 List of top 25 albums for 2002 in Australia
 New Zealand top 50 albums of 2001
 New Zealand top 50 albums of 2002

Notes

References

Bibliography

External links
USA Today article about said album's 20th anniversary

2001 debut albums
2002 remix albums
Albums produced by Alicia Keys
Albums produced by Brian McKnight
Albums produced by Jermaine Dupri
Albums with cover art by Tony Duran
Alicia Keys albums
Grammy Award for Best R&B Album
J Records albums
J Records remix albums
United States National Recording Registry recordings
United States National Recording Registry albums